Howco Productions later Howco International Pictures, was an American film production and distribution company based in South Carolina, specialising in low budget B pictures designed for double features.  

In 1951 Joy Newton Houck Sr. (born 10 July 1900, Magnolia, Arkansas died 8 July 1999, Texarkana, Texas), owner of 29 Joy Theatres in Arkansas, Louisiana, and Mississippi, teamed up with producer/director Ron Ormond and  J. Francis White, an officer of Consolidated Theatres and owner of 31 cinemas in Virginia, North and South Carolina, to contract with independent film producers to create product for their combined theatre chains. Their initials, "H, O, W," provided the name of the company.

Outlaw Women, started in November 1951, was its first production.

Initially Howco released Westerns from Ron Ormond's company featuring Lash LaRue, then moved into monster, science fiction, and exploitation films.  In 1954 Howco expanded its production with four films announced, including Kentucky Rifle. The same year, it started a television distribution company called National Television Films. Howco released Roger Corman's Carnival Rock (paired with Teenage Thunder), Ed Wood's Jail Bait (paired with The Blonde Pickup, a reissue of 1951's Racket Girls), double features such as The Brain from Planet Arous and Teenage Monster (1957), and Lost, Lonely and Vicious and My World Dies Screaming (1958). One unusual exploitation effort was derived from an aborted television series, filmed in Europe and starring radio's hillbilly comedians Lum and Abner. Howco compiled the three half-hour pilot episodes into a feature film, Lum and Abner Abroad (1956), which played to the comedians' fan base in the rural South. Howco exploited the film as "a big dish of corn with a continental flavor."

Houck Sr.'s son Joy N. Houck Jr. directed two of the company's final double bills, Night of Bloody Horror and Women and Bloody Terror (1970). In the 1970s Howco achieved success with Charles B. Pierce's films including The Legend of Boggy Creek, Bootleggers and Winterhawk.

Notes

Film distributors of the United States
Mass media companies established in 1951
1951 establishments in South Carolina